The 2004–05 Sevens World Series was the sixth edition of the global circuit for men's national rugby sevens teams, organised by the International Rugby Board since 1999–2000. The defending series champions New Zealand retained their title by winning the 2004–05 series.

Calendar

Competition format
All tournaments in the 2004–05 series were played as a standard 16-team event, beginning with the pool stage before progressing to a knockout stage to decide the tournament winners.

Pool stage
For the pool stage, teams were divided into 4 pools of 4 teams and a round-robin was played within each pool. The points awarded for the pool matches were 3 for a win, 2 for a draw, 1 for a loss. Where tie-breakers were required, the head-to-head result between the tied teams was used, followed by the difference in points scored during tournament play.

Knockout stage 
Four trophies were contested during the knockout stage – in descending order of prestige: the Cup (whose winner became the tournament champion), Plate, Bowl and Shield. The format of the playoffs is described below

Points schedule
The season championship was determined by the total points earned in all tournaments. The points schedule used for 2004–05 World Sevens Series was:

Final standings
The points awarded to teams at each event, as well as the overall season totals, are shown in the table below. Points for the event winners are indicated in bold. A zero (0) is recorded in the event column where a team played in a tournament but did not gain any points. A dash (–) is recorded in the event column if a team did not compete at a tournament.

Source: rugby7.com (archived)

Notes:
 Light blue line on the left indicates a core team eligible to participate in all events of the series.

Tournaments

Dubai

South Africa

New Zealand

United States

Singapore

France

London

References

External links

 
World Rugby Sevens Series